Colegio de Todos Los Santos is a private school in Argentina. It was founded in 1981 and has been an International Baccalaureate World School since 1988. Its classes are being taught in English and Spanish.

External links
 School website

International Baccalaureate schools in Argentina
Schools in Argentina
Private schools in Argentina
1981 establishments in Argentina
Educational institutions established in 1981